Sarry is a commune in the Saône-et-Loire department in the region of Bourgogne-Franche-Comté in eastern France.

Geography
The Arconce forms part of the commune's northwestern border. The village lies on the left bank of the Belaine, a tributary of the Arconce.

See also
Communes of the Saône-et-Loire department

References

Communes of Saône-et-Loire